Gerrit John Diekema (March 27, 1859 – December 20, 1930) was a politician from the U.S. state of Michigan.

Biography
Diekema was born in Holland, Michigan, where he attended the common schools and graduated from Hope College in 1881. In 1883, he graduated from the law department of the University of Michigan at Ann Arbor, was admitted to the bar, and commenced practice in Holland.

Career 
Diekema became a city attorney and a member of the Michigan State House of Representatives serving from 1885 to 1891 from Ottawa County 1st District, serving as speaker from 1889 to 1890. He became mayor of Holland in 1895 and chairman of the Michigan Republican Party ten consecutive years from 1900 to 1910. He was a delegate to the 1896 Republican National Convention and a member of the Spanish Treaty Claims Commission from 1901 until he resigned in 1907.

He was elected April 27, 1907, as a Republican from Michigan's 5th congressional district to the Sixtieth Congress, to fill the vacancy caused by the resignation of William Alden Smith. He was subsequently re-elected to the Sixty-first Congress, serving from March 17, 1908, to March 3, 1911. He was an unsuccessful candidate for reelection in 1910 to the Sixty-second Congress and resumed the practice of law in Holland, Michigan.

He became manager of the Republican Speakers’ Bureau in Chicago in 1912 and a candidate in the primary for Governor of Michigan in 1916. He was a delegate to the 1924 Republican National Convention from Michigan. After seventeen years he was re-elected chairman of the Michigan Republican Party, serving from 1927 to 1929, a record total of twelve years.

Diekema was appointed United States Minister to the Netherlands by President Herbert Hoover on August 20, 1929, and served until December 1930.

Personal life 
On December 20, 1930, Diekema died in The Hague, Netherlands. Diekema was interred in Pilgrim Home Cemetery, Holland, Michigan.

Bibliography

References

 
 Gerrit John Diekema entry at The Political Graveyard

External links

 

1859 births
1930 deaths
People from Holland, Michigan
American people of Dutch descent
Republican Party members of the United States House of Representatives from Michigan
Ambassadors of the United States to the Netherlands
Michigan Republican Party chairs
Speakers of the Michigan House of Representatives
Mayors of places in Michigan
Politicians from Chicago
Hope College alumni
Michigan lawyers
University of Michigan Law School alumni
Burials in Michigan